Buffalo Narrows is a northern village in Saskatchewan, Canada. It is a community of 1,110 people. Located at the "Narrows" between Peter Pond Lake and Churchill Lake, tourism and resource extraction (logging, fishing) are its main economic activities.

History 
 Buffalo Narrows or Détroit du Boeuf as it was called in French was founded in the early 20th century as trapping, mink ranching and fishing settlement by Scandinavian traders.

The community developed around an earlier Dene settlement. John Macoun, who was travelling the fur trade route from Methye Portage to Lac Île-à-la-Crosse visited the "Narrows" in September 1875. He described his visit to this old community in the following lines: "After sunrise, a headwind sprang up with which we battled all day and reached the "Narrows," that connect Buffalo and Clearwater lakes, before dark. "Chipewyan House" is situated at the eastern end of the "Narrows," and at the head of Clearwater Lake. Here the Chipewyans have built themselves several houses."

Chipewyan House where Macoun stayed for about four days was probably a small outpost of the Hudson's Bay Company much like Buffalo House at Dillon and Bull's House on the La Loche River.

Clearwater Lake (or Clear Lake) was renamed Churchill Lake in 1944 and Buffalo Lake was renamed Peter Pond Lake in 1932.

1969 axe massacre 

On 30 January 1969, the community was the site of the killing of the Pedersen family, and their friend John Herman. Seven people were killed by 19-year-old Métis labourer Frederick Moses McCallum (b. 1949), who was arrested, diagnosed with schizophrenia and found not guilty by reason of insanity. As of February 2019, he lives in Ontario.

Demographics 

Climate 
Buffalo Narrows has a humid continental climate (Koppen: Dfb) bordering on a subarctic climate (Dfc). Summers are comfortably warm with cool nights, while winters are very cold and dry.

Attractions 
Buffalo Narrows is notable for its scenery and its bridge that crosses the Kisis Channel. The bridge was officially opened in 1981 replacing a ferry that was set up in 1957. This channel links Peter Pond Lake and Churchill Lake.

Buffalo Narrows Sand Dunes Park 
Formerly Crown land, the recreation area was transferred to the northern village of Buffalo Narrows in 2003. The community has assumed the responsibility for its maintenance and development.
The beach is a nesting site of the vulnerable sparrow-sized piping plover.

Gallery

Governance 
As set out by the Northern Saskatchewan Municipal Government Act, and overseen by Municipal Relations, the village is governed by six Councillors, who are elected at-large every four years. Robert Woods is the mayor.

Transportation 
Buffalo Narrows is connected to the rest of Saskatchewan by Highway 155. Highway 155 is paved along its whole length. The community is served by the Buffalo Narrows Airport and the Buffalo Narrows Water Aerodrome.

Financial Services 
Innovation Credit Union has an Advice Centre located at #3-1491 Pederson Ave. The location includes a full service automated teller machine.

Education 
The school in Buffalo Narrows is called Twin Lakes Community School or "TLCS". The K-12 school has approximately 310 students and about 30 teachers and is part of the Northern Lights School Division # 113. Northlands College maintains a satellite campus in Buffalo Narrows.

See also 
 List of communities in Northern Saskatchewan
 List of communities in Saskatchewan
 Villages of Saskatchewan

References 

Division No. 18, Saskatchewan
Northern villages in Saskatchewan